Octávio Zani (1 January 1902 – 16 November 1967) was a Brazilian athlete. He competed in three events at the 1924 Summer Olympics.

References

External links
 

1902 births
1967 deaths
Athletes (track and field) at the 1924 Summer Olympics
Brazilian male shot putters
Brazilian male discus throwers
Brazilian male hammer throwers
Olympic athletes of Brazil
Place of birth missing